Lazarevka is the name of several inhabited localities in Russia:

Modern rural localities
Lazarevka, Amur Oblast, a selo in Tambovsky District of Amur Oblast
Lazarevka, Primorsky Krai, a selo in Yakovlevsky District of Primorsky Krai
Lazarevka, name of several other rural localities

Historical names
Lazarevka, in the 19th century, the name of the village of Lazarevskoye; since 1961—Lazarevskoye Microdistrict of Sochi